Norton Street is in the suburb of Leichhardt in Sydney, Australia. It is located 5 kilometres west of the Sydney central business district and is the main commercial street in the suburb.

Norton Street contains a mix of residential buildings, restaurants (Italian and others), cafés, eateries and individual retail outlets, including several bookstores and grocery shops. There are also hotels, a Palace Cinema, Norton Street Grocer and two of the suburb's three shopping centres: Norton Plaza and the Italian Forum.

At the southern end of the street is the Italian Forum, notable for its design which seeks to emulate the feel of a Mediterranean town piazza featuring a fountain, ringed by cafés and upmarket fashion shops.

History

The street was named in honour of James Norton (1795–1862), a colonial Sydney attorney and solicitor who purchased the grand estate of Elswick in 1834. The 30-hectare Elswick estate was bounded by Parramatta Road, Norton Street, Marion Street, and Elswick Street, Leichhardt; in 1882, it was sub-divided and offered as 600 lots.

Norton Street was once a working-class area populated primarily by first- and second-generation Italian migrants. These days, many of the original inhabitants have moved to outlying suburbs, and the area has gentrified but the Italian flavour remains with Norton Street as its centrepiece. Throughout Sydney, Norton Street is known as "Little Italy" with many Italian eateries.

Events and celebrations
During important events such as the FIFA World Cup, the street is closed and thousands of football fans gather to party . It is also the centre of an annual festival called the Italian Festa, held in October.

Transport
Norton Street is serviced by Transit Systems routes 436, 437, 438, 439, 440, 445 and 447 and the light rail to Lilyfield, and walking about 10 minutes.

Gallery

See also

References

External links

Visit New South Wales website
 Food and Wine Trails article regarding the annual Italian Fiesta
 

Streets in Sydney
Little Italys in Australia
Restaurant districts and streets in Australia
Italian-Australian history